The Knight and Death (Italian: Il cavaliere la morte) is a crime novel by Leonardo Sciascia, published in 1988.

Plot
The protagonist of the novel is a cultured and tenacious detective affected by a deadly disease (which is clearly a cancer, although it is never openly stated). 

The detective, whose name we never learn  (he is simply called "il Vice", as "the Vice Chief of Police") investigates the murder of lawyer Sandoz. His chief believes that Sandoz has been killed by a mysterious revolutionary group, but the detective is convinced that powerful businessman Aurispa is involved in the crime, and that the phoney revolutionary group has been invented ad hoc as a scapegoat to cover up the real reasons behind the murder.

The novel is permeated by a sense of impending death, as the increasingly ill and tired "Vice" tries to unravel the mystery.

Significance of title

The title is a reference to the engraving Knight, Death and the Devil by Albrecht Dürer, often observed by the "Vice" as he thinks about his imminent death.

1988 novels
Novels by Leonardo Sciascia
Novels about the Sicilian Mafia